Uran is a coastal town and part of Navi Mumbai, Maharashtra state in Konkan division. It lies in the Raigad district, east of Mumbai across the Dharamtar Creek. Uran is primarily a fishing and agriculture village, which has developed into the special economic zone of Uran. The primary languages spoken are Agri and Koli which is a dialect of Marathi-Konkani.

History
The city name is derived from the Hindu goddess Uranavati. It was called Uruvan during the rule of Madhavrao I, the fourth Peshwa of the Maratha Empire. Later, the area was named Uran by the Portuguese and Ooran by the British.

Many Indian dynasties have ruled the area. In early history, these included the Maurya Empire, Sātavāhana Empire, Western Kshatrapas, Vākāṭaka Empire, Chalukyas, and Yadavas.

The area around Mumbai, including Uran, was under Portuguese and British rule in the 16th to 19th centuries.

Uran was subject to the Maratha princely states in the Maharashtra. Uran was once the base of the famous Maratha Sarkhel (Admiral) Kanhoji Angre, who battled European naval interests in the 18th century.

Geography

On the tip of a peninsula, Uran district is surrounded by sea on three sides. The town of Uran itself is centrally located on the peninsula, flanked by Karanja village to the south and Mora village and port to the north.

Uran is home to extensive salt pans, part of a long-standing network of salt manufacturing around Mumbai. The land has been under redevelopment pressure.

The Uran wetlands were once home to many species of birds and reptiles, some critically endangered. The wetlands were developed in 2009 and 2010, leaving only the Panje-Dongri wetlands.

Economy

The main occupation in Uran is fishing; 80% of the fish production of Mumbai comes from fishermen based out of the Uran in Navi Mumbai, especially the villages of Karanja and Mora.

The second major occupation is farming. Uran contributes to the production of rice in the Raigad district. Raigad is the second largest district in terms of rice production in India.

Shipping, shipbuilding, and port support are major economic factors in Uran district. Jawaharlal Nehru Port (JNPT) is the largest container terminal in India. Other container terminals in the Uran district include APM Terminals (formerly GTI) and DP World (formerly the British Peninsular and Oriental Steam Navigation Company). Salt pan owners revolted against the government decision to build a seaport, but the port has proved to be the main source of income to residents and nearby villages, as major projects and warehouses have opened nearby.

The Indian Navy maintains a naval base near Mora. Due to Security reasons sea travel restrictions is imposed by the Indian Navy .

The Oil and Natural Gas Corporation (ONGC) has a plant nearby. GTPS-MSEB is Asia's first power plant run by natural gas.

Other industrial and manufacturing employers Grindwell Norton Limited, NAD, and the Skols Brewery (closed in 2005).

Demographics
Uran is growing. In the 2001 India census, Uran had a population of 23,254; this had increased by the 2011 census to 30,439. Males constitute 53% of the population and females 47%. In Uran, 10–11% of the population is 6 years of age or younger.

Uran's average literacy rate is also rising, from 79% in 2001 to 82% in 2011. Female literacy lags behind male literacy: male literacy was 83% in 2001 and 85% in 2011, and female literacy was 75% in 2001 and 79% in 2011. India's national literacy average is 59.5%.

Education
Schools in Uran include the following:

Bosco English School, Uran
St. Mary's School, Uran
U.E.S School, Uran
Veer Wajekar College (1919), Uran

Culture

Places of worship

Uran has many Hindu temples, some of which host annual festivals. Some of the well-known temples are:
Shanteshwari Aai Temple, Navin Sheva Uran: Shanteshwari Aai Temple is Very famous in Uran Taluka.It is in Navin Sheva village.
Ratneshwari Aai Temple, Jaskhar Uran: Ratneshwari Aai Temple is very famous in Jaskhar Village of Uran Taluka.
Its palkhi is famous in Raigad District.
 Bahiridev Temple, Sarde  Uran:' Shree Bahiridev(Ughad) is Gramdaiwat of all Sarde Village. It is Jagrut Devasthan and it is based on Creek of Sarde which is one of branch of Patalganga Creek.
Shree Raghoba Mandir, Uran Kotnaka
Raghoba Mandir Is a holy temple located near Kotnaka, Uran. Shree Raghoba palkhi sohla is very famous in Kotnaka village as well as in Uran also.
 The Jaskhar Fair that everyone awaits for, comes in the month of April and is so chaotic at times. People from various nearby villages come to worship the god and enjoy their day.
 Radhakrishna Temple, Sarde, Uran: Which is based at Radhakrisha ali(Sarde Village hill) A Grand Festival is celebrated on the occasion of Shree Krishna Jayanti. There are huge celebrations in Palakhi occasion.
Uran-Koliwada is a Hindu Temple Shree Bapujidev Mindir & Jari – Mari Mindir. 
Ratneshwari Temple, Jaskhar, Ratneshwari temple is one of the most Famous & Jagrut Devasthan in Uran city. It is very famous in Maharastra, because the temple is very attractive and it is made fully of marble. Its palkhi is very famous in Raigad District.
Dronagiri temple Karanja it is located in on a hill of Drona Giri and sea-facing.
Girobadev Temple, Khopta located in East of Karanja & Khopta creek

Mankeshwar Temple Uran: One of the temples in Uran, located right next to Mankeshwar beach, Kegoan. Dedicated to Lord Shiva, annual festival celebrated here in the month of November.
 Vinayak Temple Kegoan, Uran: located in Kegoan. Dedicated to Lord Ganesha. Very old temple constructed by Peshwas (recently refurbished). A small Hanuman Temple is directly opposite to the Ganesha Temple. A well and a pond adds to the scenery. History of this temple dates back to 1365 according to sources.
 Dargah of Hazrath Mukim Shah baba, Uran: Located in Uran it is one of the most famous dargah of Uran. It is also a tourist attraction in Uran. Devotees from nearby areas visit this dargah on a large scale.
 Uran Jama Masjid: Located in Masjid Mohalla area of Uran. It is the biggest mosque in uran.
 Dargah of Hazrat Moinuddin Qadri: Located on Uran–Karanja road.
 Masjid-e-Muhammadia: Located near Rajpal Naka
Datta Mandir: Located in Nave Popud(also known as Datta wadi) Devotees from the outskirts of Mumbai visit here during datta festival in Uran.

Other attractions

Another major tourist attraction in Uran are the three beaches: Pirwadi Beach, Nagav Beach, and Mankeshwar Beach which is frequented by tourists from nearby areas like Panvel in Navi Mumbai, other parts of Navi Mumbai, and Mumbai. A distant view of South Mumbai is visible from here. A local rural beach Kegav Beach is present, which can also be visited by tourists, and tourists do visit this beach too, but mostly it remains isolated. So, in totality, Navi Mumbai's Uran node has four beaches.

Ransai Dam is a destination in Uran. It is located near Dighode Village.

An old military fort named Dronagiri is located just beside the ONGC plant on the top of the Dronagiri mountain. This was a Maratha fort for a short period before passing into possession of the Portuguese, according to the locals. Entry has been banned for security reasons.

Khopate Village: Khopate Village is popular for Dashami Festival which is celebrated on behalf of Saint Gopalkaka Maharaj.

Dronagiri Mandir: A view from the top of the mountain where the temple of Dronagiri Devi is situated.

Bird watching at the Panje-Funde wetlands.

References
Veer tukaram hari wajekar

Cities and towns in Raigad district
Navi Mumbai
Talukas in Maharashtra